Marisela Maritza Berti Diaz (born September 9, 1950-some sources say 1955-in Maracaibo, Venezuela) is a Venezuelan actress, singer, television show host and former beauty queen. Her work in telenovelas and television talk shows has made her well known in Latin America; she has acted in Venezuela, Mexico, and the United States.

Berti is also well known in Puerto Rico, where she lived at and worked on television for more than a decade. As of 2022, she was a resident of Mexico.

Miss Venezuela contest 
Berti was Miss Zulia in 1971, representing her native state at the 1971 Miss Venezuela pageant. She ended up as the 4th. runner up at that contest.

Career 
Soon after her Miss Venezuela participation, Berti embarked oin an acting career, signed by the television network, Radio Caracas Television. She had a small role in a telenovela show named "La Usurpadora" ("The Impostor"), which was a major international hit that has spanned several remakes. In 1972, Berti participated in "Sacrificio de Mujer" ("A Woman's Sacrifice") as "Maula".

Berti participated in ten telenovelas, including "Mi Amada Beatriz" ("My Loved Beatriz") as well as "La Indomable" ("The Indomitable One"), "Doña Bárbara" ("Miss Barbara") where she played one of the main characters, named "Marisela Barquero", "Señora" ("Lady"), as "Candela Benitez" and "Dulce Ilusión" ("Sweet Illusion"), as "Zarina", among others. All of those were major hits in Latin America.

During the late 1970s and the 1980s, Berti took a hiatus in her career, as she married Puerto Rican singer Chucho Avellanet and moved to the Caribbean island-nation. She did, however, continue to appear on television from time to time.

In 1989, Berti returned to her native Venezuela for a period, to film the movie that marked her cinema acting debut, a Venezuelan film named "Cuchillos de Fuego" ("Fire Knives"), where she was one of the main stars, alongside Miguel Angel Anda and Gabriel Fernandez, among others.

She also participated in 1990's "Carmen Querida" ("Dear Carmen"), where she acted in 166 episodes as the titular character, "Carmen Luisa Mariani".

The last series that Berti appeared at before another periodical retirement was 1999's "Las Profecias de Amanda" ("Amanda's Prophecies"), before returning, 19 years later, on the international hit, "El Señor de los Cielos", as lawyer "Edith Guzman". In "El Señor De Los Cielos", Berti acted together with her son, Mexican actor Alex Walerstein.

Personal life 
Berti was married to Puerto Rican singer Chucho Avellanet, giving birth to their son Luis Armando in 1981. Berti moved to Puerto Rico during that era. She later lived with Mexican film director Mauricio Walerstein, giving birth to their son, actor Alejandro Walerstein, in 1993. Berti and Mauricio Walerstein were together until Mauricio Walerstein died.

Following Mauricio Walerstein's death in 2016, Berti battled depression. According to her, she did not feel she wanted to keep living, but she recuperated.

Health issues 
In January 2022, Berti suffered a brain stroke. She was in a coma for some time, but she has recuperated.

See also 
List of Venezuelans

References 

Living people
1950 births
People from Caracas
People from Maracaibo
People from Mexico City
Venezuelan actresses
Venezuelan emigrants to Puerto Rico
Venezuelan emigrants to Mexico